Econet Telecom Lesotho (ETL) came into being following the merger between Telecom Lesotho and Econet Ezi ~ Cel Lesotho in April 2008. When Eskom Enterprises (Pty) Limited sold its shares to Econet Wireless Global, Econet became a majority shareholder with 70% equity while the Government of Lesotho remained with 30%.

External links
 Econet Telecom Lesotho 

Telecommunications companies of Lesotho